Kuznetsov is a rural locality (a khutor) in Krasnodonskoye Rural Settlement, Ilovlinsky District, Volgograd Oblast, Russia. The population was 335 as of 2010. There are 7 streets.

Geography 
Kuznetsov is located in steppe, on the left bank of the Tishanka River, on the Volga Upland, 24 km southeast of Ilovlya (the district's administrative centre) by road. Krasnodonsky is the nearest rural locality.

References 

Rural localities in Ilovlinsky District